Events in the year 1953 in Belgium.

Incumbents
Monarch – Baudouin
Prime Minister – Jean Van Houtte

Events
 31 January to 1 February – North Sea flood damages Belgian coastal defences, killing 28
 9 April – Princess Joséphine Charlotte of Belgium (1927–2005) marries Prince Jean of Luxembourg (1921–2019), with civil registration in the Grand Ducal Palace and a nuptial mass in Notre-Dame Cathedral, Luxembourg
 14 October – Sabena Convair Crash
 24 October – Firedamp explosion in the Many pit in Seraing, owned by Ougrée-Marihaye, kills 26 (12 Belgians and 14 Italian immigrant workers)
 31 October – First public television broadcasts of the Belgian National Broadcasting Institute, from the Flagey Building in  Brussels

Publications

Non-fiction
 Gustave Cohen, Le Théâtre français en Belgique au Moyen Âge (Brussels, La Renaissance du Livre)
 Paul Harsin, La Révolution liégeoise de 1789

Fiction
 Louis Paul Boon, De Kapellekensbaan
 Hergé, Explorers on the Moon, serialised 1952-1953
 Georges Simenon, Feux rouges, Maigret et l'homme du banc, and Maigret se trompe
 Willy Vandersteen, De dolle musketiers, Suske & Wiske album (serialised 1952–1953)

Art and architecture
Paintings
 René Magritte, Golconda

Performance
 14 to 18 July – Théâtre National de Belgique production of Jean Giraudoux's Ondine at the Lyric Theatre (Hammersmith).

Births
 10 January
 Olga Zrihen, politician
 Josiane Vanhuysse, cyclist
 23 January – Carl Devlies, politician
 26 January – Daniël Theys, glassmaker
 1 February – Walter de Paduwa, radio DJ
 21 February – Siegfried Bracke, politician
 14 March – Dirk Van der Maelen, politician
 3 April – Pieter Aspe, writer (died 2021)
 5 April – Paul Broekx, Olympic canoer
 11 April – Guy Verhofstadt, politician
 1 May – Willy Linthout, comics author
 7 May – Alain Brichant, tennis player
 6 June – Jan Durnez, politician
 30 June – Koen Fossey, illustrator
 22 July – René Vandereycken, footballer
 25 August – Georges De Moor, health statistician
 20 September – André Delcroix, cyclist
 26 September – Micha Marah, singer
 27 September – Jean-Paul Comart, actor
 9 October – Marcia De Wachter, economist 
 17 October
 Thierry Soumagne, fencer
 Claire Vanhonnacker, singer (died 1992)
 27 October – Daniel Guldemont, martial artist
 28 October – Jean-Marie Berckmans, writer (died 2008)
 19 November – Didier de Chaffoy de Courcelles, businessman
 20 November – Étienne De Beule, cyclist
 4 December – Jean-Marie Pfaff, goalkeeper

Deaths
 6 January – Maurice Corneil de Thoran (born 1881), musician
 9 January – Jean Brusselmans (born 1884), painter
 17 January – Jean de Bosschère (born 1878), writer and painter
 19 January – Jean Delville (born 1867), painter
 11 March – Charles Saroléa (born 1870), philologist
 26 March – Paul Loicq (born 1888), hockey administrator
 16 May – Django Reinhardt (born 1910), jazz musician 
 2 June – Servais Le Roy (born 1865), entertainment
 20 June – Henri de Man (born 1885), politician
 25 June – Jules Van Nuffel (born 1883), priest and musicologist
 12 July – Joseph Jongen (born 1873), composer
 14 September – Pierre Nolf (born 1873), scientist
 18 September – Charles de Tornaco (born 1927), racing driver
 2 November – Émile Cammaerts (born 1878), writer

References

 
1950s in Belgium
Belgium
Years of the 20th century in Belgium
Belgium